Sapibenega is a privately owned island in Panama. It is 2.5 acre-wide. As of 2012, it is the world's eighth most expensive island.

References

Caribbean islands of Panama
Private islands of the Caribbean
Private islands of Panama